Clare FM is an Irish radio station which broadcasts to County Clare and the surrounding areas.

The station has won many Irish radio awards. Clare FM broadcasts on frequencies 95 - 96FM including 95.2, 95.5, 95.9, 96.4 & 96.6. In the past, it also provided an opt-out service.

In January 2019, it was announced that the station was sold to Radio Kerry Holdings. In July 2019, the proposed sale fell through following a breakdown during the negotiations.

A history on the beginning of the commercial radio station was released in 2019. 'Launching Clare FM' was written by Ger Sweeney, the first presenter to speak on the Clare FM airwaves.

Frequencies

References

External links
 Clare FM Website

Radio stations in the Republic of Ireland
Mass media in County Clare